Douglas Stuart (born 31 May 1976) is a Scottish-American writer and fashion designer. Born in Glasgow, Scotland, he studied at the Scottish College of Textiles and at London's Royal College of Art, before moving at the age of 24 to New York City, where he built a successful career in fashion design, while also beginning to write. His debut novel, Shuggie Bain – which had initially been turned down by many publishers on both sides of the Atlantic – was awarded the 2020 Booker Prize. His second novel, Young Mungo, was published in April 2022.

Early life 
Stuart was born in 1976 in Sighthill, a housing estate in Glasgow, Scotland. He was the youngest of three siblings. His father left him and his family when Stuart was young, and he was raised by a single mother who was battling alcoholism and addiction. His mother died from alcoholism-related health issues when he was 16. Subsequently, when he went on to write his debut Booker Prize-winning novel, Shuggie Bain, the book would be inspired by his struggles, his mother's struggles as she battled alcoholism and his relationship with his mother. Speaking about his mother, he says: "My mother died very quietly of addiction one day." After his mother's death, he lived with his older brother before moving into a boarding house when he was 17.

Writing on Literary Hub about working-class living in the late 1970s and 1980s, Stuart notes that he grew up in a house without books and surrounded by poverty. This was the time when Thatcher-era economic policies had "decimated the working man", moving industry away from the west coast of Scotland, leaving behind mass unemployment, alcoholism, and drug abuse.

He received a bachelor's degree from the Scottish College of Textiles (now Heriot-Watt University) and a master's degree from the Royal College of Art in London. He had no formal education in literature, and notes that while he wanted to study English literature in college, he was discouraged from choosing the subject by a teacher who mentioned that it would "not suit someone from his background", resulting in Stuart subsequently studying textiles instead.

Career 
Stuart moved to New York City at the age of 24 to begin a career in fashion design. He worked for many brands, including Calvin Klein, Ralph Lauren, Banana Republic and Jack Spade, for more than 20 years. Stuart secretly started to write his first novel while he was balancing 12-hour shifts as a senior director of design at Banana Republic.

Prior to his first novel being published, his works were featured on The New Yorker and on LitHub.

His first novel, Shuggie Bain, won the 2020 Booker Prize, chosen by a judging panel comprising Margaret Busby (chair), Lee Child, Sameer Rahim, Lemn Sissay, and Emily Wilson. Stuart became the second Scottish author to win the Booker Prize in its 51-year history, after it was awarded in 1994 to James Kelman for How Late It Was, How Late, a book Stuart has credited with changing his life, since it was "one of the first times he had seen his people and dialect on the page". Stuart said: "When James won in the mid-90s, Scottish voices were seen as disruptive and outside the norm."

Shuggie Bain was also longlisted for the 2021 Andrew Carnegie Medal for Excellence in Fiction, shortlisted for the 2020 Center for Fiction First Novel Prize, and was a finalist for both the 2020 Kirkus Prize and the 2020 National Book Award for Fiction. However, when Stuart wrote the novel, responses from publishers were not as encouraging, with the book being rejected by 32 US publishing companies (as well as a dozen in the UK), before it was finally sold to American independent publisher Grove Atlantic, who published it in hardcover on 11 February 2020. Shuggie Bain was later published in the United Kingdom by the Picador imprint of Pan Macmillan. As of April 2022, Shuggie Bain has sold more than 1.5 million copies globally.

The novel received generally favourable review coverage once it was published, including in The Observer, The New York Times, The Scotsman, the TLS, The Hindu, and elsewhere. The book was praised for its authentic portrayal of post-industrial working-class Glasgow of the 1980s and early 1990s, and also for his capture of the "wry, indefatigable Glaswegian voice in all its various shades of wit, anger and hope." Speaking at the Booker Prize award ceremony, Margaret Busby, chair of the panel, noted that the book was destined to be a classic, and went on to describe the work as a "moving, immersive and nuanced portrait of a tight-knit social world, its people and its values."

In a conversation with 2019 Booker winner Bernardine Evaristo on 23 November, livestreamed as a Southbank Centre event, Stuart said: "One of my biggest regrets I think is that growing up so poor I almost had to elevate myself to the middle class to turn around to tell a working-class story." Discussing the "middle-class" publishers' rejections he had received for Shuggie Bain, he told Evaristo: "Everyone was writing these really gorgeous letters. They were saying 'Oh my god this will win all of the awards and it's such an amazing book and I have never read anything like that, but I have no idea how to market it'." Stuart said in a 2021 conversation with the Duchess of Cornwall that winning the Booker Prize transformed his life.

In November 2020, Stuart revealed that he had finished his second novel, tentatively titled Loch Awe, also set in mid-1990s Glasgow. The book is a love story between two young men, set against the backdrop of post-industrial Glasgow, with its territorial gangs, and divisions across sectarian lines. In his words, the book is about "toxic masculinity" and the violence that can stem from pressures on working-class boys to "man-up". The novel was published under the title Young Mungo by Grove Press on 5 April 2022, and by Picador on 14 April 2022. Prior to its publication, it was described by Oprah Daily as "a beautiful novel about family love and the dangers of being different in a violent, hyper-masculine world", and Kirkus Reviews concluded: "Romantic, terrifying, brutal, tender, and, in the end, sneakily hopeful. What a writer."

In 2021, Stuart received an honorary doctorate from Heriot-Watt University.

In November 2022, it was confirmed that Shuggie Bain was to be made into a television drama series, adapted by Stuart himself, to be filmed in Scotland and broadcast on BBC One and iPlayer.

Stuart was the subject of a film profile entitled "Douglas Stuart: Love, Hope and Grit", first shown in November 2022 in Alan Yentob's BBC One television arts documentary series Imagine.

Personal life 
Stuart holds dual British and American citizenship. He lives in East Village, Manhattan, with his husband, Michael Cary, an art curator at the Gagosian Gallery.

Selected awards and honours 
 2020: Booker Prize for Shuggie Bain
 2020: Waterstones Scottish Book of the Year (Shuggie Bain)
 2021: American Academy of Arts and Letters: Sue Kaufman Prize for First Fiction
 2021: British Book Awards: Overall Book of the Year (Shuggie Bain)
 2021: British Book Awards: Debut Book of the Year (Shuggie Bain)
 2021: Independent Publisher Book Awards: Europe Best Regional Fiction (Bronze)
 2021: Honorary degree from Heriot-Watt University for services to fashion and literature

Bibliography

Novels 
  UK, Picador.
  UK, Picador.

Short fiction

Essays

References

External links 
 
 Douglas Stuart's official page on the Booker Prizes website.
 Cressida Leyshon, "Douglas Stuart on Growing Up Queer Before the Internet", The New Yorker, 6 January 2020.
 Lisa Allardice, "Interview | Booker winner Douglas Stuart: 'I owe Scotland everything, The Guardian, 21 November 2020.
 Teddy Jamieson, "Douglas Stuart on sexuality, sectarianism, life after the Booker and love", The Herald, 8 April 2022.

1976 births
Living people
21st-century American male writers
21st-century American novelists
21st-century LGBT people
21st-century Scottish novelists
Alumni of the Royal College of Art
American gay writers
American LGBT novelists
American male novelists
Booker Prize winners
British Book Award winners
British fashion designers
LGBT people from New York (state)
Scottish LGBT writers
Scottish emigrants to the United States
Scottish fashion designers
Scottish male novelists
Writers from Glasgow
Writers from New York City